Simon Crawshay (born 25 August 1974) is a former Australian rules footballer who played with Hawthorn in the Victorian Football League (VFL).

A ruckman, Crawshay played in three seasons for Hawthorn. He made nine appearances in both 1994 and 1995 but played just once in 1996 and was delisted. In 1995 he won a Gardiner Medal for his efforts in the reserves.

Crawshay played for South Adelaide after leaving Hawthorn.

He now teaches mathematics at Xavier College, in Melbourne, Australia. His younger brother is Olympic Gold Medallist David Crawshay.

References

1974 births
Australian rules footballers from Victoria (Australia)
Hawthorn Football Club players
South Adelaide Football Club players
People educated at Melbourne Grammar School
Living people